Parczew  is a town in eastern Poland, with a population of 10,281 (2006).  It is the capital of Parczew County in the Lublin Voivodeship.

Parczew historically belongs to Lesser Poland (Małopolska) region. The town lies 60 kilometers north of Lublin, and 70 kilometers south of Biala Podlaska. It has a rail station on the secondary-importance line from Lublin to Łuków, which was inaugurated in 1898.

History

The settlement of Parczew existed since the 12th century, lying near then-eastern border of the Kingdom of Poland. In 1401, it received Magdeburg rights town charter from King Władysław II Jagiełło. The union of Poland and Lithuania (see Union of Krewo) helped Parczew to develop, as it ceased to be a border town. The town was conveniently located on one of the routes joining the capitals of the two united nations - Kraków and Vilnius. In the Union of Horodło (1413), Parczew was designated to be the location of Polish–Lithuanian councils. The town emerged as one of the centers of political life of the two nations. Parczew was visited by all kings of the Jagiellonian dynasty, and the last council took place here in 1564.
 
Parczew had a defensive wall, with three gates, and a royal residence, where Polish kings stayed on their way to and from Vilnius. The town was the seat of a starosta, with a town hall located on the market square, two bath houses, four mills and breweries. In the 16th century, it had three Roman Catholic churches, one Orthodox church, a synagogue, a school and a hospital. In 1500 and 1544, Parczew was destroyed in Crimean Tatars raids, and in 1655, it was seized, ransacked and burned by the Swedes (see Deluge). After the wars of the mid-17th century, the town did not recover until the reign of Stanisław August Poniatowski.

Parczew administratively belonged to the Lublin Voivodeship in the Lesser Poland Province until the Third Partition of Poland in 1795, when it was annexed by Austria. It was regained by Poles following the Austro-Polish War of 1809, and included within the short-lived Duchy of Warsaw. After the duchy's dissolution, it was part of Russian-controlled Congress Poland. During the January Uprising, on June 29, 1863, it was the site of a skirmish between Polish insurgents and Russian troops. In 1898, the rail line from Lublin, via Parczew, to Łuków was built. In 1918, Poland regained independence and control of the town. During the Polish–Soviet War, the town was briefly occupied by the Russian invaders, before it was recaptured by the Poles on August 16, 1920. In the interbellum, the town had a population of 10,000.

Following the joint German-Soviet invasion of Poland, which started World War II in September 1939, the town was occupied by Germany. It was a center of Polish resistance. In local forests, numerous Home Army and Armia Ludowa units operated. On July 22, 1944, Parczew was liberated by the Home Army, and in the summer of 1945, the anti-Communist unit of Leon Taraszkiewicz attacked a local Urząd Bezpieczeństwa prison.

In 1955, Parczew County was created, and in 2001, the town celebrated its 600th anniversary. From 1975 to 1998, it was administratively located in the Biała Podlaska Voivodeship.

Jews in Parczew 
An organized Jewish community existed in the town since the early 16th century. Just before the outbreak of World War II the Jewish community numbered 5,000, more than half of the town's population.  During the German occupation of Poland the Jews were first confined to a ghetto crammed with inhabitants of neighbouring settlements as well. In the course of the Holocaust, on August 19, 1942 the Nazi German Reserve Police Battalion 101 aided by the Trawniki men rounded up and deported 3,000 Jews to Treblinka extermination camp; 2,000 more Jews were loaded onto Holocaust trains and murdered upon arrival. The battalion returned to Parczew with the same company of Hiwis in October 1942. There were 5,000 more Jews in the ghetto. They were massacred in a mass shooting action and deported, at which point the town was declared Judenfrei ("free of Jews"). The Parczew partisans anti-Nazi fighter group operated in the forests around the town, which included Jewish men and women who managed to escape the slaughter.

Sights
Among points of interest there are:
 wooden bell tower (1675),
 former synagogue (19th century),
 Neo-Gothic Collegiate Basilica of Saint John the Baptist (1905–1913).

Notable people
 Sławomir Nazaruk (born 1975), retired Polish footballer

Notes and references

External link

Cities and towns in Lublin Voivodeship
Parczew County
Lesser Poland
Siedlce Governorate
Lublin Governorate
Lublin Voivodeship (1919–1939)
Holocaust locations in Poland
Reserve Police Battalion 101